Brezovo Polje may refer to:

 Brezovo Polje, Brčko, a village in Bosnia and Herzegovina
 Brezovo Polje, Croatia, a village near Glina, Croatia